The 2012 O'Higgins F.C. season is O'Higgins F.C.'s 49th season in the Primera División and their sixth consecutive season in Primera División. The club plays in three tournaments: The Primera División de Chile, Copa Sudamericana and the Copa Chile.

The odissey of Eduardo Berizzo

For the 2012 season, the year started of abrupt form with Fernando De la Fuente's departure after a strong discussion with Eduardo Berizzo and also with the goalkeeper's coach Roberto Bonano, being confirmed then that the player will be loaned to Deportes La Serena, losing of this form to one of the best defensive midfielders of the Chilean football for face the Torneo de Apertura. However, the club's board surprised to Rancagua with the signings of the Argentine talented attacking midfielder Ramón Fernández, former footballer of Unión La Calera, who was tempted by country's powerhouse clubs: Colo-Colo and Universidad de Chile, after a very well year, the Paraguayan footballer Rodrigo Rojas, who played for teams like River Plate, and finally to Julio Barroso, defender champion of the 2005 FIFA U-20 World Cup with Argentina that played for Boca Juniors.

On 27 January 2012, the club achieved his first triumph in the Torneo de Apertura against Antofagasta at the Estadio Parque El Teniente with a goal of Ramón Fernández in the 42nd minute, losing at the capital 1–0 with Colo-Colo, the next match. On 25 February, the team achieved his most important victory against Universidad de Chile at Rancagua, with goals of Enzo Gutiérrez, Guillermo Suárez and Fernández, in where Luis Marín saved a penalty to Marcelo Díaz, earning of this form the first place, that lost when Universidad Católica in March defeated 2–1 to the team at El Teniente, then achieving with Julio Barroso and Rodrigo Rojas as the key players, the team achieved four consecutive wins, that finished when Huachipato defeated 2–1 to the club with goals of the striker Manuel Villalobos and the left back José Contreras, but despite of the defeat at the city of Talcahuano, the team led by Eduardo Berizzo, after of beat 5–0 to Palestino at Rancagua, on 28 April, more than of one hundred fans traveled for view the qualification of his team to the Copa Sudamericana, after of a 1–0 away victory over Santiago Wanderers with a goal of the midfielder Enzo Gutiérrez at Valparaíso.

On 23 June 2012, after a successful regular phase in the second place under Universidad de Chile at the top of the table, in the playoffs faced to Unión La Calera in the quarterfinals. The first match at La Calera, the team won 1–0 with a free kick goal of Ramón Fernández, who played the last season in that club, not celebrating the goal, in Rancagua for the second match, the club again won, now for a 3–2 victory, thanks to Enzo Gutiérrez, who scored a peace of goal after an incredible bicycle kick that defeated to the keeper Lucas Giovini. The next key, the club faced to Unión Española in the semifinals at Santiago, in where with a goal of the playmaker Emiliano Vecchio the club was defeated at the Estadio Santa Laura, finally winning 2–1 at the second match with goals of Luis Pedro Figueroa and Rodrigo Rojas, whilst for the club of Independencia, scored the striker Sebastián Jaime. The next game, now for the finals against the club Universidad de Chile, O'Higgins beat for the same scored of the last match to the team of the University, with goals of Rojas and the Argentine full back Alejandro López, whilst for the blues scored Guillermo Marino. O'Higgins was the Primera División champion of the Torneo de Apertura, until the 92nd minute of game in the Estadio Nacional, because with annotations of Charles Aránguiz and the same Marino, the club equalized the key, winning 2–0 in the penalties thanks to the blues' keeper Jhonny Herrera, who saved three penalties to Rodrigo Rojas, Yerson Opazo and Enzo Gutiérrez. However, the match was not exempt of polemics, because the referee Enrique Osses conceded a non–existent penalty to Marino, that was scored by Aránguiz, and unfairly red-carded to the centre back Julio Barroso, after an aggression of the right back José Rojas of Universidad de Chile.

Key Events

19 December 2011: Eduardo Berizzo joins as the coach of the club.
11 January 2012: Sebastián Pinto joins Bursaspor.
28 April 2012: The club qualified to the Copa Sudamericana.
2 July 2012: The club is the runner-up of the Primera División de Chile.

Current squad

Transfers

Apertura 2012

Actualized as February 17, 2012

In

Out

Club

Technical staff

Kit
Diadora were announced as O'Higgins' kit supplier as of the start of the season. The new kit was presented on 21 January 2012, during the Noche Celeste match against Alianza Lima.

Other information

Season results

Apertura 2012

Classification

Results summary

Clausura 2012

Classification

Results summary

Competitive

Pre-season

Noche Celeste

Apertura 2012

Play-offs

Quarterfinals

O'Higgins won 4–2 on aggregate.

Semifinals

2–2 on aggregate. O'Higgins won due to its position at the regular season (O'Higgins: 2nd, Unión Española: 5th)

Final

3–3 on aggregate. Universidad de Chile won 2–0 on penalties.

Clausura 2012

Copa Sudamericana

O'Higgins play against Cerro Porteño of Paraguay. In the first match the team draw 3-3, but with a negative point for the away goals rule. In the second match, played in Paraguay, the club lose 4–0, Cerro Porteño won on points 4–1, and O'Higgins is eliminated of the tournament.

Match G8

Cerro Porteño won on points 4–1.

Copa Chile

Group 3

References

External links
O'Higgins F.C.
Partido a Partido
Fixture 2012

O'Higgins F.C. seasons
O'Higgins
O